Orinda is a city in Contra Costa County, California, United States. The city's population as of the 2020 census is estimated at 19,514 residents.

History

Orinda is located within four Mexican land grants: Rancho Laguna de los Palos Colorados, Rancho Acalanes, Rancho El Sobrante and Rancho Boca de la Cañada del Pinole. The area was originally rural, mainly known for ranching and summer cabins. The Moraga Adobe was built in 1841, and is the oldest building in the East Bay. In the late 19th century, the land was named by Alice Marsh Cameron, probably in honor of the poet Katherine Philips, who was also known as the "Matchless Orinda".

In the 1880s, United States Surveyor General for California Theodore Wagner built an estate he named Orinda Park. The Orinda Park post office opened in 1888. The post office's name was changed to Orinda in 1895. Orinda was also the site of Bryant Station, a stop on the failed California and Nevada Railroad around the turn of the 20th century. Later, the area around Bryant Station was known as Orinda Crossroads.

Orinda's popularity as a year-round residence grew after the 1937 completion of the Caldecott Tunnel, which provided easier access to the west. Bisected by California State Route 24 and framed by its rolling oak-covered hills, the city of Orinda was incorporated on July 1, 1985. Its first mayor was Richard G. Heggie. The city is served by Orinda station on the Bay Area Rapid Transit (BART) .

Geography

Climate
The area is characterized by a warm-summer Mediterranean climate (Köppen climate classification Csb) with cool, rainy winters and warm, dry summers. Because Orinda is located in a hilly area, microclimates often dominate temperature differences in short distances. The Oakland Hills often block the cool foggy conditions that can be seen in Oakland and the innerbay. In the summer, fog can spill over the Oakland hills, cooling off the area. Heatwaves from the inland areas can be felt much more in Orinda than in Oakland and the innerbay during the summer. In the winter, Orinda often sees more precipitation than surrounding areas because of its higher elevation. Snowfall is rare but not unheard of. A dusting of snow may occur in any given year because of the elevation. During stable conditions in the winter, mornings can be cold and frosty in downtown and lower-lying areas, while the higher hills surrounding the area may be several degrees warmer.

Demographics

There were 807 people (4.6%) of Hispanic or Latino origin, of any race.

The Census reported that 17,600 people (99.8% of the population) lived in households, 6 (>0.1%) lived in non-institutionalized group quarters, and 37 (0.2%) were institutionalized.

There were 6,553 households, out of which 2,361 (36.0%) had children under the age of 18 living in them, 4,673 (71.3%) were opposite-sex married couples living together, 370 (5.6%) had a female householder with no husband present, 159 (2.4%) had a male householder with no wife present. There were 138 (2.1%) unmarried opposite-sex partnerships, and 58 (0.9%) same-sex married couples or partnerships, 1,127 households (17.2%) were made up of individuals, and 695 (10.6%) had someone living alone who was 65 years of age or older. The average household size was 2.69. There were 5,202 families (79.4% of all households); the average family size was 3.03.

The population was spread out, with 4,512 people (25.6%) under the age of 18, 729 people (4.1%) aged 18 to 24, 2,741 people (15.5%) aged 25 to 44, 6,111 people (34.6%) aged 45 to 64, and 3,550 people (20.1%) who were 65 years of age or older. The median age was 47.8 years. For every 100 females, there were 94.4 males. For every 100 females age 18 and over, there were 91.9 males.

The homeowner vacancy rate was 1.2%; the rental vacancy rate was 4.2%. 16,010 people (90.7% of the population) lived in owner-occupied housing units and 1,590 people (9.0%) lived in rental housing units.

Government

As of February 10, 2019, Orinda has 14,020 registered voters, with 6,692 (47.7%) registered as Democrats, 3,176 (22.7%) registered as Republicans, and 3,662 (26.1%) decline to state voters.

Education
Orinda has four public elementary schools: Sleepy Hollow Elementary, Wagner Ranch Elementary, Glorietta Elementary and Del Rey Elementary. Orinda Intermediate School is the only middle school. Together, these five schools make up the Orinda Union School District. Orinda's high school, Miramonte High School, is a part of the Acalanes Union High School District.

Orinda is home to three private educational establishments: Orinda Academy, Holden High School, and Fountainhead Montessori School. Of these, two (OA & Holden) are private high schools, while Fountainhead Montessori School services kindergarten through fifth grade.

The Contra Costa County Library has a branch in Orinda.

Notable people 
 Poul Anderson, science fiction author
 Troy Auzenne, football star
 Bryan Barker, NFL football punter
 Jim Barnett, Golden State Warriors player and TV color commentator
 Theodore Temple (Ted) Beckett, football star
 Drew Bennett, former NFL wide receiver; graduated from Miramonte High School in 1996
 Nicole Branagh, Olympic beach volleyball player
 Matt Cain, pitcher for San Francisco Giants
 Kirsten Costas, high school student murdered by her classmate, Bernadette Protti, in 1984
 Paul Dini, writer, cartoonist; lived in Orinda from 1963 to 1988
 Ken Dorsey, former quarterback for San Francisco 49ers and Cleveland Browns
 Patricia C. Dunn, former Chairwoman of the Board of Hewlett-Packard
 Sheila E., drummer and percussionist
 Adonal Foyle, NBA center for Golden State Warriors and Orlando Magic
 John Hammergren, CEO of McKesson; highest-paid CEO in US (2011–2013)
 John Hampton, co-founder of Toys for Tots
 Sabrina Ionescu, WNBA star with the New York Liberty
Brett Jackson, MLB player
 Robert Karplus, physicist and educator
 Hans Kelsen, one of preeminent jurists of 20th Century
 Harry Arthur "Cookie" Lavagetto (1912–1990), MLB third baseman, manager and coach, and pinch-hitter
 Daniel Levitin, best-selling author, cognitive neuroscientist, musician 
 David Marchick, Washington, D.C. lobbyist
Hans Niemann, chess grandmaster
 Wayne F. Miller, photographer
 Karen Moe, Olympic swimming gold medalist
 William Penn Mott Jr., director of National Park Service from 1985 to 1989
 Heather Petri, Olympic water polo player
 Susan Polk, Orinda housewife sentenced to 16-to-life for murder of husband, Felix Polk
 Gary Radnich, news broadcaster
 Julie Rubio, filmmaker
 Sam Shankland, chess grandmaster and 2018 US Chess Champion
 Dana Sparks, actress and spokesperson, Falcon Crest, Passions, L.A. Law, L'Oréal, Mercedes Benz
 Owsley Stanley, audio engineer and legendary psychedelic chemist
 Jeremy Stoppelman, Founder of Yelp.com
 Rawson Marshall Thurber, filmmaker and actor
 Nicolle Wallace, political commentator, former White House Communications Director and senior adviser to John McCain's presidential campaign
 Claudell Washington, former Major League Baseball player
 Will Wright, designer of computer games such as SimCity and The Sims
 Daniel Wu, a Hong Kong actor who was raised in Orinda

See also

References

External links
 
 Orinda Chamber of Commerce

 
Cities in Contra Costa County, California
Cities in the San Francisco Bay Area
Incorporated cities and towns in California